The Diyari, alternatively transcribed as Dieri, is an Indigenous Australian group of the South Australian desert originating in and around the delta of Cooper Creek to the east of Lake Eyre.

Language

Diyari is classified as one of the Karnic languages. Though earlier described in Ethnologue as extinct, and later "nearly extinct", Peter Austin has attested that the language still has fluent native speakers and hundreds of Diyari who retain some knowledge of it. Lutheran missionaries developed an orthography to transcribe the language, together with a German-Diyari dictionary, as early as 1893 and, as later modified by Johann Flierl, this was taught to many Diyari-speakers, who corresponded in the language from the 1880s down to the 1960s. Diyari was the first Aboriginal language for which a complete translation of the New Testament was made.

The Diyari also had a highly developed sign language, which was first noticed by Alfred William Howitt in 1891, who first mistook them for defiant or command gestures until he realised that they formed part of an integral system of hand signs, of which he registered 65. One of their functions was to allow women to communicate during mourning, when a speech taboo prevailed.

Country
The southern boundary was marked by Mount Freeling, its most northern reach by the Pirigundi Lake, on the Cooper Creek. The most easterly edge was constituted by Lake Hope, and the western limits lay some 80 miles west of Lake Hope. Their neighbouring tribes were the Yandruwandha and Yawarrawarrka, respectively to their east and north-east and, to the north, the Ngameni. To their north-west were the Wangganguru, to their west the Thirrari and Arabana, while on the southern fringes were the Kuyani and Adnyamathanha.

The environment was harsh, and foraging for vegetables was a staple since the kangaroo was absent from their terrain and the emu, their favourite food, quite rare. Native rats, snakes and lizards were, however, abundant.

Mythology
Lorimer Fison (1880):
After the creation, brothers, sisters, and others of the closest kin, intermarried promiscuously, until — the evil effects of these alliances  becoming manifest — a council of the chiefs was assembled to consider in what way they might be averted, the result of their deliberations being a petition to the Muramura (Good Spirit), in answer to which he ordered that the tribe should be divided into branches, and distinguished one from another by different names, after objects animate and inanimate, such as dogs, mice, emu, rain, iguana, and so forth; the members of any such branch not to intermarry, but with permission for one branch to mingle with another. Thus, the son of a dog might not marry the daughter of a dog, but either might form an alliance with a mouse, rat, or other family. This custom is still observed, and the first question asked of a stranger is, "What murdoo?", i.e., "Of  what family are you?".
The Diyari creation story imagined Mooramoora, the good spirit, making small black lizards at first, and delighted with them, they decided should hold sway over all other created beings. It was by remodulating this variety of lizard, cutting off the tail, and using his forefinger to create a nose, that man was created, and then divided into male and female. Mooramoora then had the Moon create all creatures. Man could not run down the fleet, tasty emu, and the deity was asked to make heat so that it would tire and allow men to catch up and trap it. Men were asked to perform certain ceremonies, considered obscene by Gason, and after their compliance, Mooramoora created the sun.

History of contact
Lutheran missionaries established the Bethesda or Killalpaninna Mission among the Dieri in 1866. The first ethnographic reports regarding the Diyari were written by a police trooper, Samuel Gason (1845–1897) in 1874. He estimated the numbers of Aborigines in the Cooper Creek area at 1000-1200, of which the Diyari were the most prominent, with an estimated 230 members. By the end of WW2, they were estimated to number around 60.

Kinship system
The Diyari foundational myths stated that originally man was incestuously promiscuous, fathers, mothers, sons and daughter all marrying each other. To overcome the strife that ensued, the Elders petitioned the Mooramoora creator for a solution, which consisted in splitting the tribe into distinct branches, each designated by an animal or natural name, and then disallow marriage among members of the same branch.

Before the white intrusion on their lands made its impact, the Dieri were divided into two tribal groups, the Ku'na:ri around Cooper Creek and the Pandu in proximity of Lake Hope.

Their kinship system was first studied by Howitt, who took it as exemplifying a form of one of the most socially backward of Australian tribes. Alfred Radcliffe-Brown analysed the Diyari kinship structure as a variant of the Arrernte system. Their moieties were  Matharri and Kararrhu, in accordance with the general  divisions among speakers of Thura-Yura languages in South Australia.

Social system
Gason thought the Diyari extremely treacherous, nourished by suspicion from infancy. At the same time, he said they displayed exemplary hospitality, revered the aged, and adored their children. Any stranger who passed through their camp, was provided with food. Infanticide was widespread, by Gason's calculation, affecting some 30% of births and was performed by the mother. They were very attached to their camp dingos, treating them as they would a human.

Native title 
The Dieri Aboriginal Corporation (DAC) incorporated in 2001 and by 2014 had 600 members living in Marree, Lyndhurst, Port Augusta, Whyalla and in Broken Hill in New South Wales. The group purchased the Marree Station property surrounding Marree in 2008.

Alternative names
 Diari, Diyeri, Dieyerie, Dieri
 Deerie, Dieyrie, Dayerrie
 Dthee-eri, Dickeri (misprint)
 Kunari. (the native name for Cooper Creek)
 Koonarie
 Wongkadieri (Arabana exonym)
 Wonkadieri
 Ti:ari (Southern Aranda exonym)
 Urrominna (southern name not only for the Diyari, but also for the Kuyani

Some words
 kunki (Man of high degree/clever man/medicine man)
 kutyi'' (malign spirit, devil)

See also 
 Adno-artina, a spirit that appears in Diyari stories
 Kadimakara, monsters in Diyari stories that have been associated with extinct megafauna

Notes

Citations

Sources

Further reading
 Dieri Aboriginal Corporation Dieri Native Title Claims info

Aboriginal peoples of South Australia